Joseph D. Collins (born January 11, 1988) is an American football wide receiver who is currently a free agent.

College career
He attended Monterey Peninsula Junior College, where he had 10 receptions for 198 receiving yards and three touchdowns in a single game during his 2007 season. In his senior season, he was named 2010–11 Weber State Male Athlete of the Year and was the Crystal Crest recipient for Male Athlete of the Year. He was unanimously selected to the Big Sky All-Conference First-team following the conclusion of his senior season. He was selected to the Third-team All-American honors from The Sports Network and Phil Steele.

Professional career

Hamilton Tiger-Cats
On May 24, 2012, he signed with the Hamilton Tiger-Cats of the Canadian Football League.

New York Jets
On August 7, 2012, he signed with the New York Jets. On August 31, he was released in the final roster cuts. On January 2, 2013, he re-signed with the team to a reserve/future contract. He was released on August 26, 2013.

References

External links 
 New York Jets profile
 Weber State profile

1988 births
Living people
American football wide receivers
New York Jets players
Weber State Wildcats football players
Monterey Peninsula Lobos football players
People from Seaside, California
Players of American football from California